is a Japanese actor, singer and voice actor perhaps best known for his role as Gen Ohtori/Ultraman Leo in the Ultraman Series. He performed the show's theme song heard in the first 12 episodes as well.

Filmography

External links
Tamura Pro Profile 
Voice Garage Profile 

1950 births
Living people
People from Yokohama
Japanese male actors